Endri is a predominantly an Albanian masculine given name and may refer to:
Endri Bakiu (born 1987), Albanian footballer
Endri Çekiçi (born 1996), Albanian footballer
Endri Dalipi (born 1983), Albanian footballer
Endri Fuga (born 1981), Albanian politician 
Endri Hasa (born 1981), Albanian politician
Endri Karina (born 1989), Albanian weightlifter
Endri Muçmata (born 1996), Albanian footballer 
Endri Vinter (born 1993), Estonian swimmer

Albanian masculine given names